University of Kurdistan may refer to:
 University of Kurdistan (Iran), Sanandaj, Iranian Kurdistan Province
 Kurdistan University of Medical Sciences, Sanandaj, Iranian Kurdistan Province
 University of Kurdistan Hewler, Hawler (Erbil), Kurdistan Region, Iraq